Fanning is an unincorporated community in Doniphan County, Kansas, United States.

History
Fanning had its start in the year 1870 by the building of the Burlington and Missouri River Railroad through that territory.

A post office was opened in Fanning in December, 1870, and remained in operation until it was discontinued in July, 1933.

References

Further reading

External links
 Doniphan County maps: Current, Historic, KDOT

Unincorporated communities in Doniphan County, Kansas
Unincorporated communities in Kansas
1870 establishments in Kansas
Populated places established in 1870